Lake White State Park is a public recreation area located on the southwest edge of Waverly in Pike County, Ohio, United States.

History
Part of Lake White State Park includes the remains of the old Ohio and Erie Canal channel. The lake was built during the Great Depression by the Works Progress Administration (W.P.A.). Most of the land surrounding the lake is privately owned. Lake White was officially dedicated as a state park in 1949 when the Division of Parks and Recreation was created.

In August 2014, the dam showed signs of leaking and required major repairs. The lake was drained to allow for the process to begin. In July 2015, the Ohio Department of Transportation announced the awarding of a contract to fix the dam and the bridge that goes over it.

References

External links

Lake White State Park Ohio Department of Natural Resources
Lake White State Park Map Ohio Department of Natural Resources

State parks of Ohio
Protected areas of Pike County, Ohio
Protected areas established in 1949
1949 establishments in Ohio
Works Progress Administration in Ohio